Kristin Gjesdal is a Norwegian philosopher and Professor of Philosophy at Temple University. She is known for her expertise in the field of hermeneutics (focusing especially on Hans-Georg Gadamer), nineteenth-century philosophy, aesthetics, and phenomenology. Gjesdal is a member of The Norwegian Academy of Science and Letters.

Awards and honours
Fulbright Foundation fellowship
Alexander von Humboldt Foundation fellowship
Eleanor Hofkin Award for Excellence in Teaching

Books
 Herder's Hermeneutic Philosophy: History, Poetry, Enlightenment, Cambridge University Press, 2017
 Gadamer and The Legacy of German Idealism, Cambridge University Press, 2009
 The Drama of History: Ibsen, Hegel, Nietzsche, Oxford University Press, 2020

References

External links
 Kristin Gjesdal

21st-century American philosophers
Hermeneutists
Continental philosophers
Philosophy academics
Gadamer scholars
Living people
American women philosophers
University of Oslo alumni
Academic staff of the University of Oslo
Norwegian women philosophers
Herder scholars
Members of the Norwegian Academy of Science and Letters
Year of birth missing (living people)
21st-century American women